The 2016 season is Seinäjoen Jalkapallokerho's 9th competitive season, and third in the Veikkausliiga. SJK where defending champions, having won the 2015 title, and will enter the UEFA Champions League for the first time.

Squad

Available youth players

Out on loan

Transfers

Winter

In:

Out:

Trial:

Summer

In:

Out:

Friendlies

Competitions

Veikkausliiga

League table

Results summary

Results by matchday

Results

Finnish Cup

Final

League Cup

Final

UEFA Champions League

Qualifying stage

Squad statistics

Appearances and goals

|-
|colspan="14"|Players away on loan:

|-
|colspan="14"|Players who left SJK during the season:

|}

Goal scorers

Clean sheets

Disciplinary record

References

2016
Sjk